Padenia bifasciatus is a moth of the subfamily Arctiinae. It was described by Rothschild in 1912. It is found in New Guinea.

References

Lithosiini
Moths described in 1912